The Chronicles of TK is the debut album from Tynisha Keli originally titled, "Even If It Takes Forever". The album features the singles, "I Wish You Loved Me" and "Shatter'd". It also debuted at number twelve on the Japanese Albums Chart with sales of over 10,192 copies in the first week. The album was released digitally on April 21, 2009, and physically in Japan on April 22.

Background 
Keli delivers her story with uplifting optimism, setting vignettes from her life, both happy and sad, to an irresistible backdrop of urban-influenced rhythmic groove and touching R&B balladry crafted by leading songwriters and producers Kara DioGuardi and J.R. Rotem, who between them have worked with such artists as P!nk, Britney Spears, Rihanna, Gwen Stefani, Kelly Clarkson, Ashlee Simpson, and Ashley Tisdale.

The recording sessions of "Chronicle" spawned additional contributions from Soulshock & Karlin: Carsten Schack and Kenneth Karlin ("Lonely Days"), James Poyser ("There Goes My Baby"), Mario Barrett ("The Greatest Performer"), Shaffer "Ne-Yo" Smith ("Stay or Go") and The Jam: Michael Mani & Jordan Omley ("My Everything"), but none of the tracks made it to the final cut.

Singles
 "I Wish You Loved Me" (2007), Warner Bros. Records
 "Shatter'd" (2009), Warner Bros. Records
 "The Boy is Mine" (2009), Warner Bros. Records

Official track listing (The Chronicles of TK)

Premium edition (CD)

Premium edition (CD/DVD)

Original track listing (Even If It Takes Forever)
The tracks on the album were confirmed on Tynisha's official MySpace.

 All Aboard
 So Beautiful
 Like Everybody Else
 Stay
 Cry
 Let It Go
 Can We
 Defeated
 I Wish You Loved Me
 Spotless Mind
 MisUnderstood

Chart performance

References 

2009 debut albums
Albums produced by J. R. Rotem
Albums produced by Rico Love
Albums produced by Twin
Tynisha Keli albums